Aleksandar Kraychev (born 28 October 1951) is a Bulgarian former weightlifter who competed in the 1972 Summer Olympics.

References

1951 births
Living people
Bulgarian male weightlifters
Olympic weightlifters of Bulgaria
Weightlifters at the 1972 Summer Olympics
Olympic silver medalists for Bulgaria
Olympic medalists in weightlifting
Place of birth missing (living people)
Medalists at the 1972 Summer Olympics
20th-century Bulgarian people
21st-century Bulgarian people